The 1990 United States Senate election in Minnesota was held on November 6, 1990. Incumbent Republican U.S. Senator Rudy Boschwitz was defeated by Democratic challenger Paul Wellstone in a tight race. Widely considered an underdog and outspent by a 7-to-1 margin, Wellstone was the only candidate to defeat an incumbent senator as well as the only candidate to flip a seat in the 1990 election cycle and gained national attention after his  upset victory. The race was also notable as the first in the history of the U.S. Senate where both major-party candidates were Jewish.

General Election

Major Candidates 
 Paul Wellstone, professor at Carleton College and nominee for Minnesota State Auditor in 1982

 Rudy Boschwitz, incumbent U.S. Senator

Campaign 
Paul Wellstone was considered to be a longshot candidate, being outspent by a margin of 7-to-1. Wellstone used grassroots campaigning tactics, and quirky campaign ads like "Fast Paul", where he spoke quickly about himself and his platform, and "Looking for Rudy", a two minute ad where he went searching for his opponent Rudy Boschwitz throughout Minnesota.

Results

See also 
 1990 United States Senate elections

References 

1990 Minnesota elections
Minnesota
1990